The 1998 Rado Open was a men's tennis tournament played on outdoor Clay in Gstaad, Switzerland that was part of the International Series of the 1998 ATP Tour. It was the thirty-first edition of the tournament and was held from 6 July until 12 July 1998. Third-seeded Àlex Corretja won the singles title.

Finals

Singles

 Àlex Corretja defeated  Boris Becker, 7–6(7–5), 7–5, 6–3

Doubles

 Gustavo Kuerten /  Fernando Meligeni defeated  Daniel Orsanic /  Cyril Suk, 6–4, 7–5

References

External links
 Official website 
 ATP tournament profile
 ITF tournament edition details

Rado Open
Swiss Open (tennis)
Rado Open
Rado Open